The 2018–19 Tulsa Golden Hurricane men's basketball team represented the University of Tulsa during the 2018–19 NCAA Division I men's basketball season. The Golden Hurricane, led by fifth-year head coach Frank Haith, played their home games at the Reynolds Center in Tulsa, Oklahoma as members of the American Athletic Conference. They finished the season 18–14, 8–10 in AAC play to finish in a tie for seventh place. They lost in the first round of the AAC tournament to SMU.

Previous season
The Golden Hurricane finished the 2017–18 season 19–12, 12–6 in AAC play to finish in fourth place. They lost in the quarterfinals of the AAC tournament to Memphis.

Offseason

Departures

Incoming transfers

Roster

January 7, 2019 – Zeke Moore elected to transfer to SIU Edwardsville after the fall semester.

Schedule and results

|-
!colspan=9 style=| Exhibition

|-
!colspan=9 style=| Non-conference regular season

|-
!colspan=6 style=| AAC regular season

|-
!colspan=9 style=| AAC tournament

References

2018–19 American Athletic Conference men's basketball season
2018-19
2019 in sports in Oklahoma
2018 in sports in Oklahoma